Apsarasa radians is a moth of the family Noctuidae first described by John O. Westwood in 1848. It is found in the north-eastern parts of the Himalayas, south-eastern Asia, the Andamans, Peninsular Malaysia, Sumatra, Borneo, the Philippines and Sulawesi. Apsarasa radians most frequently has been known to prefer lowland forest areas with an average rainfall intensity between 1000m and 1200m.

References

Acronictinae
Moths of Asia
Moths of Japan
Moths described in 1848